Olleros District is one of twenty-one districts of the province Chachapoyas in Peru.

References

Districts of the Chachapoyas Province
Districts of the Amazonas Region